Harry Elliott may refer to:

Harry Elliott (baseball) (1923–2013), major league outfielder
Harry Elliott (English cricketer) (1891–1976), English wicket keeper
Harry Elliott (New Zealand cricketer) (1870–1941), New Zealand cricketer
Harry Elliott (wrestling promoter) (1905–2006), American wrestling promoter 
H. Chandler Elliott (1909–1978), physician and writer

See also
Harry Elliot (1920–2009), British space scientist
Harold Elliott (disambiguation)
Henry Elliott (disambiguation)